Bilston Central railway station was a station on the London Paddington to Birkenhead via Birmingham Snow Hill line. It was built in 1854 and served the town of Bilston in the West Midlands. It closed in 1972, with the end of passenger services on the Snow Hill and the line to Wolverhampton, although goods trains continued to pass through the site of the station until this section of the line was closed in January 1983. It saw a second incarnation when a Midland Metro stop of the same name was opened a few hundred yards away in May 1999.

Gallery

References

Disused railway stations in Wolverhampton
Former Great Western Railway stations
Railway stations in Great Britain opened in 1854
Railway stations in Great Britain closed in 1972
1854 establishments in England